Mikita Labastau (born 19 April 1997) is a Belarus biathlete. He has competed in the Biathlon World Cup since 2007.

Career results

Olympic Games

World Championships

References

External links

1997 births
Living people
Sportspeople from Udmurtia
Belarusian male biathletes
Russian male biathletes
Biathletes at the 2022 Winter Olympics
Olympic biathletes of Belarus